Nabi Kandi or Nabikandi may refer to:
 Nabi Kandi, Chaldoran
 Nabikandi, Miandoab
 Nabi Kandi, Takab